Directstep is the twenty-fourth studio album by jazz pianist Herbie Hancock. The record was released exclusively in Japan on January 21, 1979, via the Japanese CBS/Sony label. Participating musicians include saxophonist Bennie Maupin, keyboardist Webster Lewis, bass guitarist Paul Jackson, guitarist Ray Obiedo, percussionist Bill Summers, and drummer Alphonse Mouzon.

Overview
Directstep, released only in Japan, was one of the earliest albums ever released on CD. Webster Lewis became second keyboardist on this album in order for Hancock to handle the multiple layers of electronic texture that he hoped to achieve. Hancock re-recorded "I Thought It Was You" (originally on Sunlight), making it even more electronic with his vocoding. "Butterfly" was also re-recorded (originally on Thrust) making Directstep the second album after the original version (the first being Flood), to have a rendition of "Butterfly".  (The fourth would be Dis Is da Drum and the tune is also featured on Kimiko Kasai's LP, Butterfly, which Herbie plays on.)  "Shiftless Shuffle" would later be re-recorded for 1980's Mr. Hands.

Track listing
CBS/Sony – 38DP 39

Personnel 
 Herbie Hancock - Fender Rhodes, clavinet; Oberheim, Prophet, Yamaha CS-80 and Minimoog synthesizers; vocals, Sennheiser Vocoder
 Webster Lewis - Hammond B-3 organ; Prophet, Yamaha CS-40, ARP String Ensemble and Minimoog synthesizers; Fender Rhodes, backing vocals
 Bennie Maupin - soprano saxophone, tenor saxophone, lyricon
 Ray Obiedo - electric guitar
 Paul Jackson - electric bass
 Alphonse Mouzon - drums
 Bill Summers - percussion

References 

1979 albums
Herbie Hancock albums
Columbia Records albums
Albums produced by Dave Rubinson